Roberto Berardi (born 4 June 1972) is an Italian politician who served as a Senator from 23 March 2018 to 13 October 2022.

References

1972 births
21st-century Italian politicians
Politicians from Grosseto
Forza Italia (2013) politicians
Senators of Legislature XVIII of Italy
Living people
20th-century Italian people